The Berkshire Record Office is the county record office for Berkshire, England. It is located in Reading. The Berkshire Record Office opened on 10 August 1948 in The Forbury, Reading. It moved to the new Berkshire Shire Hall, beside the M4, in 1981, and to its present home in Coley Avenue, Reading, in 2000.

References

Further reading
Flynn, Sarah & Stevens, Mark. 'Petty criminals, publicans and sinners : petty sessions records in the Berkshire Record Office', Journal of the Society of Archivists 16 (1995), 41–53.
Green, Angela. 'The Berkshire Record Office', Berkshire Archaeological Journal 68 (1975-6), 89–95. 
Hull, Felix. 'The Berkshire Record Office', Berkshire Archaeological Journal, 51 (1949 for 1948–9), 10–16.
Walne, Peter. 'Local archives of Great Britain, 18: the Berkshire Record Office', Archives 4:22 (1959), 65–74.

External links
Official website

Archives in Berkshire
Organisations based in Berkshire
Buildings and structures in Reading, Berkshire
Organizations established in 1948
County record offices in England